Klemp is a German surname. It stems from the male given name Clemens – and may refer to:
Harold Klemp (1942), spiritual leader of Eckankar
Joseph B. Klemp, American atmospheric scientist
Pia Klemp (1983), German biologist and human rights activist

References 

German-language surnames
Surnames from given names